This article includes records and statistics related to Zamalek SC.

All stats are accurate as of 27 June 2015.

Honours

Worldwide / Intercontinental
Afro-Asian Cup
 Winners (2): 1987, 1997
 Runners-up (1): 1994

African
CAF Champions League
Winners (5): 1984, 1986, 1993, 1996, 2002
 Runners-up (3): 1994, 2016, 2020
African Cup Winners' Cup
 Winners (1): 2000
CAF Confederation Cup
 Winners (1): 2019
CAF Super Cup
 Winners (4): 1994, 1997, 2003, 2020 (February)
 Runners-up (1): 2001

UAFA Competitions
 Arab Champions Cup
 Winners (1): 2003

League
Egyptian Premier League
Winners (14): 1959–60, 1963–64, 1964–65, 1977–78, 1983–84, 1987–88, 1991–92, 1992–93, 2000–01, 2002–03, 2003–04, 2014–15, 2020–21, 2021–22
 Runners-up (34): 1950–51, 1952–53, 1953–54, 1955–56, 1956–57, 1957–58, 1958–59, 1960–61, 1961–62, 1962–63, 1965–66, 1972–73, 1976–77, 1978–79, 1979–80, 1980–81, 1981–82, 1982–83, 1984–85, 1985–86, 1986–87, 1988–89, 1994–95, 1995–96, 1996–97, 1997–98, 1998–99, 2005–06, 2006–07, 2009–10, 2010–11, 2015–16, 2018–19, 2019–20
Cairo League
 Winners (15): 1922–23, 1923–24, 1928–29, 1929–30, 1931–32, 1939–40, 1940–41, 1943–44, 1944–45, 1945–46, 1946–47, 1948–49, 1950–51, 1951–52, 1952–53
 Runners-up (6):  1936–37, 1937–38, 1941–42, 1942–43, 1945–46, 1957–58

Cup
Egypt Cup
 Winners (28): 1922, 1932, 1935, 1938, 1941, 1943, 1944, 1952, 1955, 1957, 1958, 1959, 1960, 1962, 1975, 1977, 1979, 1988, 1999, 2002, 2008, 2013, 2014, 2015, 2015–16, 2017–18, 2018–19, 2020–21
 Runners-up (13): 1927–28, 1930–31, 1932–33, 1933–34, 1941–42, 1947–48, 1948–49, 1952–53, 1962–63, 1977–78, 1991–92, 2005–06, 2006–07, 2010–11
Egyptian Super Cup
 Winners (4): 2001–02, 2002–03, 2015–16, 2019–20
 Runners-up (5): 2003–04, 2004–05, 2008–09, 2014–15, 2015–16
 Sultan Hussein Cup
 Winners (2): 1920–21, 1921–22
 Runners-up (3): 1923–24, 1929–30, 1936–37
King Fouad Cup
 Winners (3)
Saudi-Egyptian Super Cup (League Winners)
Winners (2): 2003, 2018
Jordan International Cup (Egyptian-Jordanian Cup)
 Winners (2): 1986, 1987
Independence Cup (Friendship Cup)
 Winners (2)

Domestic
Alexandria Summer League
 Winners (3): 1982, 1984, 2004
Giza League
 Winners (1)
October League Cup
 Winners (1): 1973–74
Egypt's Love Cup
 Winners (1): 1986
Union Cup "Egypt" (association football)
 Winners (1):  1995
Egypt Confederation Cup Refresher
 Winners (4)

All trophies are approved by Egyptian football Association website  and Zamalek SC Official Facebook page.

Players

Appearances

Goalscorers

Most goals scored in all competitions: 138 – Abdel Halim Ali
Most goals scored in the League: 81 – Abdel Halim Ali
Most goals scored in October League Cup: 9 - Hassan Shehata
Most goals scored in the cup: 23 – Alaa El-Hamouly
Most goals scored in all African competitions: 23 – Abdel Halim Ali
Most goals scored in all Arabian competitions: 13 – Abdel Halim Ali

Awards Winners

African Footballer of The Year
The following players won African Footballer of the Year while playing for Zamalek:
 Emmanuel Amuneke – 1994

Al-Ahram Hebdo Egyptian Best footballer award
The following players won Al-Ahram Hebdo Egyptian Best footballer award while playing for Zamalek:
 Ahmed El-Kass – 1994
 Ismail Youssef – 1996
 Tarek El-Said – 2000
 Hossam Hassan – 2001

Al-Shabab & Al-Reyada Annual Awards
The following players won Al-Shabab & Al-Reyada Annual Awards while playing for Zamalek:
 Ahmed El-Shenawy – 2015 (Best GK)
 Ali Gabr – 2015 (Best CD)
 Ibrahim Salah – 2015 (Best MF)

Team records

Matches
First League match: Farouk (Zamalek) 5–1 El-Masry, Week 1, 22 October 1948.
First Egypt Cup match: Mokhtalat (Zamalek) 4–0 Tersana SC, first round, 3 March 1922.
First African Cup Winners' Cup match: Zamalek 3–0 Al Ahly (Tripoli), first round, 7 May 1976.
First CAF Champions League match: Zamalek 2–1 Simba S.C., first round, 16 March 1979.
First CAF Cup match: Zamalek 0–1 Gor Mahia, first round, 21 March 1998.
First CAF Confederation Cup match: Rayon Sports 3–1, 2nd round, 15 March 2015.

Season-by-season performance

League record by opponent

References

Zamalek SC